Massimiliano Duran (born 3 November 1963) is an Italian former professional boxer who competed from 1986 to 1994. He held the WBC cruiserweight title from 1990 to 1991 and the European cruiserweight title from 1993 to 1994. He is also known for being the only fighter in boxing history to earn a shot at, win, and defend a world title with three consecutive disqualification wins.

Professional career

Duran was born in Ferrara. His father was the Argentine-Italian boxer Juan Carlos Duran; his brother, the Italian boxer Alessandro Duran. Duran turned pro in 1986 when he defeated Momo Cupelic. The win earned him the nickname "Momo". Duran's first defeat came at the hands of Ndomingiedi Lusikina. This bout began a long-standing rivalry that resulted in the two boxers fighting each other five times as professionals.
 
In 1990 Duran won the WBC cruiserweight title by defeating Carlos De León, when De León was disqualified for hitting after the bell to end the 11th round. Duran was leading on the cards.

His first title defence was against Anaclet Wamba. Duran won by disqualification after Wamba had been penalized a total of five points. Duran lost a rematch the following year by 11th round technical knockout. and the rubber match by knockout.

In 1993 Duran beat Derek Angol by KO for the vacant European crown but subsequently lost the title by stoppage to Carl Thompson. Duran suffered permanent damages to his left eye in a match with Alexey Ilyin and retired shortly after.

Following his retirement, Duran worked as a boxing trainer in his gym “Pugilistica Padana Vigor” in Ferrara.

Professional boxing record

See also
List of world cruiserweight boxing champions

References

External links

|-

1963 births
Living people
Italian male boxers
Sportspeople from Ferrara
Italian sportspeople of Argentine descent
Cruiserweight boxers
World cruiserweight boxing champions
European Boxing Union champions
World Boxing Council champions